Kuttram Seiyel (Tamil: குற்றம் செய்யேல், English: Don't commit crimes) is a 2019 Malayasian Tamil-language action crime film. The films follows a police who is determined to take down a famous gangster in the city, while two groups of college students started doing research on the case. It is released on 7 March 2019 in Malaysia. The film was screened at Chennai.

Synopsis
There is a famous gangster in the city who is constantly extorting and obtaining money from the business community in that area. He will even kills anyone who are against him. A police officer is determined to take down the gangster and end the crime. Meanwhile, things worsen when two groups of college students begin interested on the case and do their own research on it.

Cast

Production 
The film was shot in Malaysia and India in sixty days. The cast comprises Indian actors Bose Venkat, Vijith, and Dheena and Malaysian actors Selvamuthu Sam. The film is about the gangsterism of Malaysian Indians.

Track listing

See also 

 List of Malaysian Tamil films

References

External links 
 Kuttram Seiyel on Cinema.com.my
 Kuttram Seiyel on Popcorn Malaysia

Tamil-language Malaysian films
Malaysian action drama films
2010s Tamil-language films
Malaysian crime drama films